Bass Culture is an album by dub poet Linton Kwesi Johnson, released in 1980 on the Island Records label. It was produced by Linton Kwesi Johnson and Dennis Bovell (credited as Blackbeard). Bovell, Lloyd "Jah Bunny" Donaldson and Webster Johnson were members of Matumbi.

The track "Reggae fi Peach" laments the death of Blair Peach, an activist who was killed in London during a clash with police officers while protesting with the Anti-Nazi League against a British National Front meeting in 1979.

Track listing 
All tracks written by Linton Kwesi Johnson

 "Bass Culture" – 6:04
 "Street 66" – 3:43
 "Reggae fi Peach" – 3:09
 "Di Black Petty Booshwah" – 3:36
 "Inglan Is a Bitch" – 5:26
 "Loraine" – 4:08
 "Reggae Sounds" – 3:09
 "Two Sides of Silence" – 2:13

Personnel 
Linton Kwesi Johnson – vocals
Floyd Lawson (tracks: 1, 6), Vivian Weathers (tracks: 2–5, 7–8) – bass
Lloyd "Jah Bunny" Donaldson (tracks: 1, 3–8), Winston Curniffe (track: 2) – drums, percussion
John Kpiaye – guitar
Dennis Bovell, Webster Johnson – keyboards
Dick Cuthell, Henry "Buttons" Tenyue – flugelhorn, trumpet
Julio Finn – harmonica
Clinton Bailey, Everald "Fari" Forrest – percussion
James Danton – alto saxophone
Henry "Buttons" Tenyue – tenor saxophone
Rico – trombone
Technical
Dennis Bovell – engineer, mixing
John Caffrey, Mark Angelo Lusardi – engineer
Dennis Morris – sleeve concept and design

References 

Island Records albums
1980 albums
Linton Kwesi Johnson albums